Jessie Jensen Guera Djou (born 3 May 1997), is a Cameroonian footballer who currently plays as a midfielder for Croatian side NK Varaždin.

Club career
On 3 October 2017, Sheriff Tiraspol announced the signing of Guera Djou.

Career statistics

Club

Notes

References

1997 births
Living people
Cameroonian footballers
Cameroonian expatriate footballers
Association football midfielders
Championnat National 2 players
Moldovan Super Liga players
Croatian Football League players
FC Sheriff Tiraspol players
CS Petrocub Hîncești players
NK Varaždin players
Cameroonian expatriate sportspeople in Moldova
Cameroonian expatriate sportspeople in Croatia
Expatriate footballers in Ghana
Expatriate footballers in Monaco
Expatriate footballers in Moldova
Expatriate footballers in Croatia
Cameroonian expatriate sportspeople in Ghana